Santhià railway station is the main station serving the comune of Santhià, in the Piedmont region, northwestern Italy. It is the junction of the Turin–Milan, Santhià–Biella and Santhià–Arona railways.

The station is currently managed by Rete Ferroviaria Italiana (RFI). Train services are operated by Trenitalia.  Each of these companies is a subsidiary of Ferrovie dello Stato (FS), Italy's state-owned rail company.

History
The station was opened from 1856, with Turin–Milan railway.

Features
Five tracks of which are equipped with platforms, pass through the station.

Train services
The station is served by the following services:

Express services (Regionale Veloce) Turin - Chivasso – Santhià – Vercelli – Novara – Milan
Regional services (Treno regionale) Turin - Chivasso - Santhià - Biella
Regional services (Treno regionale) Chivasso - Santhià - Vercelli - Novara
Regional services (Treno regionale) Santhià - Biella San Paolo

Bus services
Since 17 June 2012 the train service to Arona has been suspended and replaced by a bus service.

See also

 History of rail transport in Italy
 List of railway stations in Piedmont
 Rail transport in Italy
 Railway stations in Italy

References

External links

Railway stations in Piedmont
Railway stations opened in 1856
Santhià